In discrete geometry and discrepancy theory, the Heilbronn triangle problem is a problem of placing points in the plane, avoiding triangles of small area. It is named after Hans Heilbronn, who conjectured that, no matter how points are placed in a given area, the smallest triangle area will be at most inversely proportional to the square of the number of points. His conjecture was proven false, but the asymptotic growth rate of the minimum triangle area remains unknown.

Definition
The Heilbronn triangle problem concerns the placement of  points within a shape in the plane, such as the unit square or the unit disk, for a given  Each triple of points form the three vertices of a triangle, and among these triangles, the problem concerns the smallest triangle, as measured by area. Different placements of points will have different smallest triangles, and the problem asks: how should  points be placed to maximize the area of the smallest 

More formally, the shape may be assumed to be a compact set  in the plane, meaning that it stays within a bounded distance from the origin and that points are allowed to be placed on its boundary. In most work on this problem,  is additionally a convex set of nonzero area. When three of the placed points lie on a line, they are considered as forming a degenerate triangle whose area is defined to be zero, so placements that maximize the smallest triangle will not have collinear triples of points. The assumption that the shape is compact implies that there exists an optimal placement of  points, rather than only a sequence of placements approaching optimality. The number  may be defined as the area of the smallest triangle in this optimal  An example is shown in the figure, with six points in a unit square. These six points form  different triangles, four of which are shaded in the figure. Six of these 20 triangles, with two of the shaded shapes, have area 1/8; the remaining 14 triangles have larger areas. This is the optimal placement of six points in a unit square: all other placements form at least one triangle with area 1/8 or smaller. Therefore, 

Heilbronn's conjecture and its disproof
Heilbronn conjectured prior to 1951 that the minimum triangle area always shrinks rapidly as a function —more specifically, inversely proportional to the square  In terms of big O notation, this can be expressed as the bound

In the other direction, Paul Erdős found examples of point sets with minimum triangle area proportional  demonstrating that, if true, Heilbronn's conjectured bound could not be strengthened. Erdős formulated the no-three-in-line problem, on large sets of grid points with no three in a line, to describe these examples. As Erdős observed, when  is a prime number, the set of  points  on an  integer grid (for  have no three collinear points, and therefore by Pick's formula each of the triangles they form has area at  When these grid points are scaled to fit within a unit square, their smallest triangle area is proportional  matching Heilbronn's conjectured upper bound. If  is not prime, then a similar construction using a prime number close to  achieves the same asymptotic lower 

 eventually disproved Heilbronn's conjecture, by using the probabilistic method to find sets of points whose smallest triangle area is larger than the ones found by Erdős. Their construction involves the following steps:
Randomly place  points in the unit square, for 
Remove all pairs of points that are unexpectedly close together.
Prove that there are few remaining low-area triangles and therefore only a sublinear number of cycles formed by two, three, or four low-area triangles. Remove all points belonging to these cycles.
Apply a triangle removal lemma for 3-uniform hypergraphs of high girth to show that, with high probability, the remaining points include a subset of  points that do not form any small-area triangles.
The area resulting from their construction grows asymptotically as

The proof can be derandomized, leading to a polynomial-time algorithm for constructing placements with this triangle area.

Upper bounds
Every set of  points in the unit square forms a triangle of area at most inversely proportional  One way to see this is to triangulate the convex hull of the given point  and choose the smallest of the triangles in the triangulation. Another is to sort the points by their  and to choose the three consecutive points in this ordering whose  are the closest together. In the first paper published on the Heilbronn triangle problem, in 1951, Klaus Roth proved a stronger upper bound  of the form

The best bound known to date is of the form

Specific shapes and numbers
 has investigated the optimal arrangements of  points in a square, for  up to 16. Goldberg's constructions for up to six points lie on the boundary of the square, and are placed to form an affine transformation of the vertices of a regular polygon. For larger values   improved Goldberg's bounds, and for these values the solutions include points interior to the square. These constructions have been proven optimal for up to seven points. The proof used a computer search to subdivide the configuration space of possible arrangements of the points into 226 different subproblems, and used nonlinear programming techniques to show that in 225 of those cases, the best arrangement was not as good as the known bound. In the remaining case, including the eventual optimal solution, its optimality was proven using symbolic computation techniques.

The following are the best known solutions for 7–12 points in a unit square, found through simulated annealing; the arrangement for seven points is known to be optimal.

Instead of looking for optimal placements for a given shape, one may look for an optimal shape for a given number of points. Among convex shapes  with area one, the regular hexagon is the one that  for this shape,  with six points optimally placed at the hexagon vertices. The convex shapes of unit area that maximize  have

Variations
There have been many variations of this problem 
including the case of a uniformly random set of points, for which arguments based on either Kolmogorov complexity or Poisson approximation show that the expected value of the minimum area is inversely proportional to the cube of the number of points. Variations involving the volume of higher-dimensional simplices have also been studied.

Rather than considering simplices, another higher-dimensional version adds another  and asks for placements of  points in the unit hypercube that maximize the minimum volume of the convex hull of any subset of  points. For  these subsets form simplices but for larger values  relative  they can form more complicated shapes. When  is sufficiently large relative  randomly placed point sets have minimum  convex hull  No better bound is possible; any placement has  points with  obtained by choosing some  consecutive points in coordinate order. This result has applications in range searching data structures.

See also
Danzer set, a set of points that avoids empty triangles of large area

Notes

References

External links

Discrete geometry
Triangle problems
Area
Discrepancy theory